Anthony "Tony" Gibb (born 12 July 1976) is a British former track cyclist. He is now a commentator for Eurosport.

Major results

2000
 1st  Points race, National Track Championships
 1st  Madison, National Track Championships (with James Taylor)
2001
 1st  Scratch, National Track Championships
 1st  Madison, National Track Championships (with James Taylor)
2002
 2nd Scratch, World Track Championships
2003
 1st Six Days of Turin (with Scott McGrory)
2004
 1st  Madison, National Track Championships (with James Taylor)
2005
 1st  Madison, National Track Championships (with James Taylor)
2006
 1st  Madison, National Track Championships (with James Taylor)
 1st  Omnium, National Track Championships

References

External links

1976 births
Living people
English male cyclists
People from Stanmore
English track cyclists
Cyclists from Greater London
Commonwealth Games medallists in cycling
Commonwealth Games bronze medallists for England
Cyclists at the 2002 Commonwealth Games
Medallists at the 2002 Commonwealth Games